|}

The Prix Cléopâtre is a Group 3 flat horse race in France open to three-year-old thoroughbred fillies. It is run over a distance of 2,100 metres (about 1 mile and 2½ furlongs) at Saint-Cloud in May.

History
Named after Cleopatra, the event was established at Saint-Cloud in 1952. The first running was won by Marche Lorraine.

The race was temporarily switched to Maisons-Laffitte in 1990. It was staged at Évry in 1991. It returned to Saint-Cloud in 1992.

The Prix Cléopâtre sometimes serves as a trial for the Prix de Diane. The last horse to win both races was Pawneese in 1976.

Records
Leading jockey (5 wins):
 Olivier Peslier – Diamonixa (1998), Sunday Picnic (1999), Spring Oak (2001), Turtle Bow (2002), Galikova (2011)

Leading trainer (13 wins):
 André Fabre – Wemyss Bight (1993), Valley of Gold (1995), Allurement (1997), Diamonixa (1998), Sunday Picnic (1999), Spring Oak (2001), Vadawina (2005), Alloway (2006), Vadapolina (2007), Flying Cloud (2009), Baltic Baroness (2013), Harajuka (2021), Place Du Carrousel	(2022)

Leading owner (6 wins):
 Guy de Rothschild – Cerisoles (1957), Azulene (1959), Marella (1960), Alphee (1966), Insolite (1971), Indian Rose (1988)
 Aga Khan IV – Kalajana (1994), Kalisi (1996), Vadawina (2005), Vadapolina (2007), Dalkala (2012), Shamkala (2014)

Winners since 1979

Earlier winners

 1952: Marche Lorraine
 1953: Banassa
 1954: Marijuana
 1955: Mahina
 1956: Djelfina
 1957: Cerisoles
 1958: Danoise
 1959: Azulene
 1960: Marella
 1961: Carpe Diem
 1962: Lady Dissenter
 1963: Doronic
 1964: Res
 1965: Ma
 1966: Alphee
 1967: Dourdan
 1968: Hugger Mugger
 1969: Lastarria
 1970: Peronelle
 1971: Insolite
 1972: Licata
 1973: Passiova
 1974: Tropical Cream
 1975: Feuille Morte
 1976: Pawneese
 1977: Guile Princess
 1978: Abalvina

See also
 List of French flat horse races

References

 France Galop / Racing Post:
 france-galop.com – A Brief History: Prix Cléopâtre.
 galopp-sieger.de – Prix Cléopâtre.
 horseracingintfed.com – International Federation of Horseracing Authorities – Prix Cléopâtre (2017).
 pedigreequery.com – Prix Cléopâtre – Saint-Cloud.

Flat horse races for three-year-old fillies
Saint-Cloud Racecourse
Horse races in France
Cleopatra
1952 establishments in France
Recurring sporting events established in 1952